Dale Hamilton (March 4, 1909 – September 1, 2002) was an American athlete and coach. Hamilton served as a sports coach and athletic director, at Central State University in Edmond, Oklahoma.

Early life and education
Hamilton was born in Mena, Arkansas. He was raised in Bristow, Oklahoma. He attended Bristow High School and graduated in 1928. He attended the Central State Teachers College (later, Central State University, now the University of Central Oklahoma, where Hamilton participated on the football, track, and basketball teams. In football, he played linebacker and center. While at Central State he earned twelve varsity letters.

Coaching career

Pre-1940
After graduation from CSTC in 1933, Hamilton coached at Cushing High School in 1933, he later coached at Bristow, and Ponca City before returning to Central State in 1936 under Claude Reeds. He then became head coach of the Broncho men's basketball team. He led the team to the 1939 NAIA Division I men's basketball tournament. In 1940 Reeds stepped down as both football coach and athletic director, Hamilton took his place in both roles.

Head football coach and two wars
Beginning in 1941, Hamilton, led the Bronchos to seven conference championships. In 1941 the Bronchos had a 6–2 record. The 1942 campaign saw many small schools suspend their football programs and the Bronchos won the OCAC with an undefeated 7–0 (2–0 conference) record. Hamilton then served during World War II. After the war, Hamilton did not resume his basketball coaching duties, but remained at the helm of the football program. He led the Bronchos to two more conference championships and a 24–9–2 four seasons before he took a leave of absence to serve again during the Korean War. After finishing his tour of duty, he resumed coaching duties and led the Bronchos to three more conference championships and a 36–16–1 record. In 1957, he decided to retire from football coaching with an overall record of 73–25–3.

Later coaching and administrative work

Hamilton remained athletic director until 1976, meanwhile he coached the men's golf and tennis teams. He also served as a referee for Missouri Valley Conference basketball games. In 1993 the University of Central Oklahoma decided to rename Hamilton Field House in his honor. He died on September 1, 2002, at the age of 93.

Head coaching record

College football

College basketball

References

1909 births
2002 deaths
American football centers
American football linebackers
American men's basketball players
Central Oklahoma Bronchos athletic directors
Central Oklahoma Bronchos football coaches
Central Oklahoma Bronchos men's basketball coaches
Central Oklahoma Bronchos men's golf coaches
Central Oklahoma Bronchos men's tennis coaches
Central Oklahoma Bronchos football players
Central Oklahoma Bronchos men's basketball players
Central Oklahoma Bronchos men's track and field athletes
High school basketball coaches in Oklahoma
High school football coaches in Oklahoma
United States Navy personnel of World War II
United States Army personnel of the Korean War
Basketball coaches from Oklahoma
People from Mena, Arkansas
People from Bristow, Oklahoma
Players of American football from Oklahoma